Kim Jong-Shin (Hangul: 김종신, Hanja: 金鍾信; born May 17, 1970 in Hampyeong, Jeollanam-do) is a retired South Korean freestyle wrestler.

Kim first garnered attention in the 1988 World Junior Wrestling Championships, held in Wolfurt, Austria where he won the gold medal in the freestyle 50 kg class. Next year, he captured the gold medal at the 1989 World Wrestling Championships, held in Martigny, Switzerland, defeating future Olympic champion Li Hak-Son of North Korea 4–2 in the final match.

Kim currently runs his own sambo gym in Seoul.

External links
Kim Jong-Shin's profile from sports-references

1970 births
Living people
South Korean wrestlers
Olympic wrestlers of South Korea
Wrestlers at the 1992 Summer Olympics
South Korean male sport wrestlers
Olympic silver medalists for South Korea
Olympic medalists in wrestling
Asian Games medalists in wrestling
Wrestlers at the 1990 Asian Games
Wrestlers at the 1994 Asian Games
World Wrestling Championships medalists
Medalists at the 1992 Summer Olympics
Asian Games gold medalists for South Korea

Medalists at the 1990 Asian Games
Sportspeople from South Jeolla Province
20th-century South Korean people
21st-century South Korean people